Hasso von Bismarck (July 22, 1902, Lüneburg, Prussian Province of Hanover, Germany – June 22, 1941, Taurage, Lithuanian SSR, Soviet Union) was a German bobsledder who competed in the early 1930s. He finished seventh and last in the four-man event at the 1932 Winter Olympics in Lake Placid, New York. He was killed in action during World War II, on the very first day of Operation Barbarossa.

References

External links
1932 bobsleigh four-man results
Descendants of Herbord von Bismarck

Bobsledders at the 1932 Winter Olympics
Olympic bobsledders of Germany
German male bobsledders
1902 births
1941 deaths
German Army personnel killed in World War II
People from Lüneburg
Sportspeople from Lower Saxony
German Army soldiers of World War II